Damadamm! is a 2011 Bollywood romantic comedy film directed by Swapna Waghmare Joshi. The film stars Himesh Reshammiya opposite Sonal Sehgal and Purbi Joshi in lead roles. Reshammiya plays a scriptwriter who is fed up of his girlfriend who always suspects him, though after she goes on holiday he openly parties and flirts with other girls. The real chaos starts once his girlfriend returns. The film released on 27 October 2011 coinciding Diwali festival, received negative reviews from critics .

Plot
Damadamm is about the life of Sameer, a writer who writes scripts for Indian films. He works with his girlfriend, Shikha at the industry. Shikha is totally over-possessive over Sameer, and suspects him all the time. Due to a speciality, Sameer cannot dump her either. He has no idea how to get rid of Shikha's suspicion, until one day her family invites her over for a relatives' wedding. She leaves for a few weeks, and until then, Sameer gets his total freedom. He drinks; parties and even flirts with random girls. One day, a new girl Sanjana enters into his office and it is love at first sight for both of them. The two are then assigned to work together on a film, but Sameer has to be careful, as Sanjana is his boss' younger sister. Whilst working together, Sameer and Sanjana start to fall in love.

During this, Sameer even starts to ignore Shikha's phone calls. Getting fed up, Shikha arrives back home, when she sees how close Sameer and Sanjana have gotten within 15 days she gets jealous, causing an argument with Sameer and the two break up. She then starts friendship with Sameer, after his boss arranges for Sameer and Sanjana's wedding. But before the wedding Sameer eventually realises he truly loved Shikha and cannot live without her, so he breaks the marriage with Sanjana. Therefore, his boss sacks him, whereas Sameer replies that he would rather pick his girlfriend Shikha then his work. Sameer manages to convince Shikha to give him another chance.

Later, the boss rehires both Sameer and Shikha and even throws them a party. (The film ends with celebrations and the song "Umrao Jaan").

Cast
 Himesh Reshammiya as Sameer "Sam" / Babu
 Purbi Joshi as Shikha
 Sonal Sehgal as Sanjana
 Rajesh Khattar as Sameer's boss / Sanjana's brother
 Lily Patel as Lily Aunty

Reception

Reviews
Taran Adarsh of Bollywood Hungama says "On the whole, DAMADAMM isn't bad, but it isn't great either. Though it has a hit score to its credit and some endearing moments, it will have to rely on a strong word of mouth to withstand a mighty opponent [RA.ONE]." Mayank Shekhar of Hindustan Times added, "This film actually has a darn good script"

Dainik Bhaskar reviews it as "The story is simple, predictable with pinch of humour and emotions. This love saga is something anyone would have watched millions of times, however, what's noteworthy is the placement of the sequences which are successful in letting the story be a simple one and not complicating it further".

Box office
The film had taken a slow but steady start and the first week wrapped up at Rs 40 million nett, domestically. It was declared a box office disaster by BoxOfficeIndia.

Print and advertising costs, amounting to Rs 21 million had already been recovered from music rights, Indian video and overseas rights, which were collectively sold at Rs 23.1 million (Music: Rs 17.1 million, Indian video: Rs 3 million and overseas rights: Rs 3 million). Also, the cost of production, pegged at Rs 30 million, which was recovered through satellite rights.

Film collected Rs. 72.5 million at the box office in 3rd week.

Soundtrack

The film's original soundtrack has been composed by Reshammiya and Sachin Gupta while the lyrics are penned by Sameer, Sachin Gupta and Shabbir Ahmed. Damadamm! was called one of the top 11 soundtracks of 2011 by Bollywood Hungama

Track list

Home Media
It premiered worldwide on Colors, just a week before its DVD release on 3 Dec 2011.

References

External links 
 

Films scored by Himesh Reshammiya
2010s Hindi-language films
2011 films
HR Musik films
Films directed by Swapna Waghmare Joshi